is the 63rd single by the J-pop group Morning Musume, was released on March 8, 2017. The group releases it under the name Morning Musume '17.

Members at time of single 
 9th generation: Mizuki Fukumura, Erina Ikuta
 10th generation: Haruna Iikubo, Ayumi Ishida, Masaki Sato , Haruka Kudo
 11th generation: Sakura Oda
 12th generation: Haruna Ogata, Miki Nonaka, Maria Makino, Akane Haga
 13th generation : Kaede Kaga, Reina Yokoyama

Background 
It is the group's first single to feature its 13th generation members, Reina Yokoyama and Kaede Kaga.

Masaki Sato doesn't participate in the A-sides's as she is still on hiatus recovering from spinal disc herniation.

Release 
It is a double-A-side single.

The single is released in five versions: 2 CD-only regular editions and 3 CD+DVD limited editions. The first press of both regular editions comes with a trading card, randomly selected from two sets of 13 (one set of 13 cards for each edition). The limited editions instead of a trading card include a lottery card to win a ticket to one of special events held by the group.

SP Edition 
The SP edition of the single includes two additional songs.

One of them, "Morning Misoshiru" ("Morning Miso Soup"), is a remake of the group's first major-label single "Morning Coffee", that appeared in 1998.

The other, "Get You!", is sang by a group called Sashining Musume, which consists of Morning Musume and Rino Sashihara (HKT48 member). The song's lyrics are penned by Yasushi Akimoto.

Track listings

Limited Editions A and B, Regular Editions A and B

Limited Edition SP

References

External links 
 Profile at Hello! Project
 Profile at Up-Front Works

2017 singles
Zetima Records singles
Morning Musume songs
Japanese-language songs
Electronic songs